13 Corps, 13th Corps, Thirteenth Corps, or XIII Corps may refer to:

 XIII Corps (Grande Armée), a unit of the Imperial French Army during the Napoleonic Wars
 XIII (Royal Württemberg) Corps, a unit of the Imperial German Army
 XIII Corps (Ottoman Empire)
 XIII Corps (United Kingdom)
XIII Army Corps (Wehrmacht), a German unit in the Second World War
 XIII Corps (United States)
 XIII Corps (Union Army), a unit in the American Civil War

See also
 13th Army (disambiguation)
 13th Battalion (disambiguation)
 13th Brigade (disambiguation)
 13th Division (disambiguation)
 13th Group (disambiguation)
 13th Regiment (disambiguation)
 13 Squadron (disambiguation)